The 1939 Purdue Boilermakers football team was an American football team that represented Purdue University during the 1939 Big Ten Conference football season.  In their third season under head coach Allen Elward, the Boilermakers compiled a 3–3–2 record, finished in fourth place in the Big Ten Conference with a 2–1–2 record against conference opponents, and outscored opponents by a total of 56 to 53.

Schedule

References

Purdue
Purdue Boilermakers football seasons
Purdue Boilermakers football